Alessandro Felipe Oltramari (born March 30, 1988), most commonly known as Alessandro, is a Brazilian goalkeeper.

Honours
Vasco da Gama
Copa do Brasil: 2011

Contract
25 March 2008 to 31 December 2009

External links
 Profile 
 Contract 
 

1988 births
Living people
Brazilian footballers
Brazilian expatriate footballers
Campeonato Brasileiro Série A players
Persian Gulf Pro League players
Grêmio Foot-Ball Porto Alegrense players
CR Vasco da Gama players
Clube Náutico Capibaribe players
Expatriate footballers in Iran
Association football goalkeepers